West's Pictures was a short-lived Australian film production and exhibition company during the silent era. It was established by English theatrical entrepreneur Thomas James West (1885-1916) who helped turn the company into one of Australia's largest exhibitors. The company also produced a regular newsreel and several narrative films, some made by Franklyn Barrett.

Many of their early films were contemporary stories made on a joint writer-technician-director basis.

It merged with Australasian Films in 1912, becoming part of the combine that later became the Greater Union organisation.

T. J. West's film company was often confused in the public mind with that of A. J. West's quite separate 'Our Navy' company (incorporated 1902), but there was no connection. However, T. J. West did secure the exclusive right in 1912 to show A. J. Wests's 'Our Navy' films in Bournemouth (Bournemouth Graphic, 27/09/1912).

Select filmography
The Christian (1911)
All for Gold, or Jumping the Claim (1911)
The Strangler's Grip (1912)
The Mystery of the Black Pearl (1912)
The Eleventh Hour (1912)
A Silent Witness (1912)

See also

List of film production companies
List of television production companies

References

External links
West's Pictures at IMDb
West's Pictures at National Film and Sound Archive

1910s in Australian cinema
Film production companies of Australia